Rocky Ford or Rockyford may refer to:

Canada
Rocky Ford, Alberta, a locality
Rockyford, Alberta, a village

United States
Rocky Ford, Colorado, a city
Rocky Ford Station
Rocky Ford, Georgia, a town
Rocky Ford, Indiana, an extinct town
Rocky Ford, North Carolina, a community
Rocky Ford, Oklahoma, census-designated place
Rockyford, South Dakota, a community
Rocky Ford Township, Mellette County, South Dakota